The 1921 Clemson Tigers football team represented Clemson Agricultural College—now known as Clemson University—as a member of the Southern Intercollegiate Athletic Association (SIAA) during the 1921 college football season. Under first-year head coach E. J. Stewart, the Tigers posted an overall record of 1–6–2 with a mark of 0–4–2 in SIAA play. J. H. Spearman was the team captain.

Schedule

References

Clemson
Clemson Tigers football seasons
Clemson Tigers football